Adam Musil (born 26 March 1997) is a Czech-Canadian ice hockey player for Dynamo Pardubice and the Czech national team.

He was drafted 94th overall in the 2015 NHL Entry Draft by the St. Louis Blues, and represented the Czech Republic at the 2021 IIHF World Championship.

References

External links

1997 births
Living people
Canadian ice hockey left wingers
Czech expatriate ice hockey players in the United States
Czech ice hockey centres
Czech ice hockey left wingers
Chicago Wolves players
Canadian expatriate ice hockey players in the United States
HC Bílí Tygři Liberec players
Ice hockey people from British Columbia
Red Deer Rebels players
San Antonio Rampage players
People from Delta, British Columbia
St. Louis Blues draft picks
Canadian ice hockey centres